Between 1883 and 1906 Tierra del Fuego experienced a gold rush attracting many Chileans, Argentines and Europeans to the archipelago, including many Dalmatians. The gold rush led to the formation of the first towns in the archipelago and fueled economic growth in Punta Arenas. After the gold rush was over, most gold miners left the archipelago, while the remaining settlers engaged in sheep farming and fishing. Indigenous Selk'nam populations declined sharply during the rush.

Early discoveries
Early attempts to find gold centered in the rivers next to Punta Arenas which drain Brunswick Peninsula to the Strait of Magellan. Small finds occurred in 1869, and in 1870 the governor of Magallanes Óscar Viel sent a 35-gram gold nugget to Chilean president José Joaquín Pérez as a gift. From April 1870 to April 1871 at least 15 kg gold were mined near Punta Arenas. Most gold ended up in Valparaíso and the ships that engaged in commerce in the increasingly busy port of Punta Arenas. In the 1870s a few settlers of the Falkland Islands moved to Punta Arenas to search for gold, as did John G. Hamilton and Federico Shanklin, two well-known English veteran miners of California and Australia. Their efforts did however appear to have failed. In 1879 an expedition led by Chilean Navy officer Ramón Serrano Montaner discovered gold in some watercourses of western Tierra del Fuego. In 1880-1881 enterprises and mining camps at the gold fields discovered by Montaner's expedition were established.

The rush begins
The gold rush was triggered in 1884. On the night of 23 to 24 September that year the French steamship Arctique ran aground on the northern coast of Cape Virgenes, in Argentina near the border with Chile. An expedition sent for its rescue discovered gold in a place called Zanja a Pique. When news reached Punta Arenas many inhabitants left for Zanja a Pique. There were various reports of extraordinary gold findings in Zanja a Pique, where individual Frenchmen, Germans and Chileans extracted more than ten kilograms in less than one month. From Punta Arenas the news then reached Buenos Aires. When the miners who acquired the Argentine mining rights for the location arrived to Zanja a Pique, almost no gold was left with miners based in Chile having already abandoned the place.

The rush and Julius Popper expedition
In Buenos Aires the press compared the gold findings to the rushes of Australia and California. In that city many companies were formed for the purpose of extracting gold. Julio Popper, a mining engineer, was contracted by one of these companies in Buenos Aires. Popper then proceeded to recruit a number of Dalmatians from the many immigrants that lived in Buenos Aires those years. With these workers Popper set out to exploit the findings of El Páramo in San Sebastián Bay. Another camp was established in Sloggett Bay at the southern coast of Isla Grande de Tierra del Fuego.

The gold rush reached the Chilean islands south of Beagle Channel so that by 1893 over one thousand men, most of them Dalmatians, lived there. However, by 1894 gold extraction begun to decline in these islands and deposits became gradually depleted. A number of enterprises formed in the 1900s to extract gold from the islands south of Beagle Channel ended with meager results.

Legacy

During his work in Tierra del Fuego Popper was involved in the killings of native Selk'nam, which came later to be known as the Selk'nam genocide.

Around the island gold diggers, sheep herders and "even police" are reported to have assaulted Indian camps to acquire their women. This created a shortage of women among Fuegian tribes. The capture and control of women in the main island worsened conflicts between rival groups. There are also reports of trade of women during deals between men. By 1894 Porvenir consisted of five houses, two of them liquor stores and a third one a brothel.

The Dalmatians involved in the gold rush gradually left mining activities either to return to Dalmatia or Buenos Aires or establish themselves in Punta Arenas. The gold rush caused an improvement in the geographical knowledge of the poorly known islands south of Beagle Channel and linked them to Punta Arenas. Gold extracted in Isla Grande de Tierra del Fuego generally left the zone without improving much the economy of southernmost South America, but in the case of the gold extracted in from the islands south of Beagle Channel much of it ended up in Punta Arenas where it fueled economic growth.

See also
 Chilean silver rush
 Boundary treaty of 1881 between Chile and Argentina
 German colonization of Valdivia, Osorno and Llanquihue

References

History of Tierra del Fuego
History of mining in Chile
Mining in Argentina
Gold rushes
History of Magallanes Region
1880s in Chile
1880s in Argentina
1890s in Chile
1890s in Argentina
1900s in Chile
1900s in Argentina
1883 in Chile
1883 in Argentina
1906 in Chile
1906 in Argentina